This is a list of the tallest lighthouses, by tower height (as opposed to focal height, i.e. height of the lamp of a lighthouse from water level). The list includes only "traditional lighthouses", as defined by The Lighthouse Directory, i.e. buildings built by navigation safety authorities primarily as an aid to navigation. As such, its  information regarding construction, year, and notes is from the list of tallest lighthouses at The Lighthouse Directory. Sources are given for all other information. Heights are from the United States Coast Guard Light List for the United States and from NGA List of Lights for the rest of the world, unless a better source exists.  Where several lighthouses share the same height, they share the same position, and are all marked with "=".

See also
 List of lighthouses and lightvessels

References 

Lighthouses